Dragana Kovačević (born 26 December 1981) is a Serbian former racing cyclist. She twice finished as a runner-up at the Serbian National Road Championships in 2012 and 2015, and she also competed in the women's road race at the UCI Road World Championships in 2007 and 2013.

References

External links

1981 births
Living people
Serbian female cyclists
Place of birth missing (living people)